Saint Hesychius is venerated as the patron saint of Cazorla, Spain.  

He is one of the group of Seven Apostolic Men (siete varones apostólicos), seven Christian clerics ordained in Rome by SS Peter and Paul, and sent to evangelize Spain.  Besides Hesychius, this group includes Torquatus, Caecilius, Ctesiphon, Euphrasius, Indaletius, and Secundius (Torcuato, Cecilio, Tesifonte, Eufrasio, Hesiquio y Segundo).

Tradition makes him a Christian missionary of the 1st century, during the Apostolic Age.  He evangelized the town of Carcere, Carteia, or Carcesi, identified as Cazorla, became its first bishop, and was martyred there by  stoning at La Pedriza.

The identification of the places where they are said to have evangelized is imprecise: sources also state that Carcere or Carcesi is not Cazorla but Cieza.

References

External links

Patron Saints: Indaletius
 Hesychius von Carteia

Saints from Hispania
1st-century Christian martyrs